Authentication and authorization infrastructure (AAI) refers to a service and a procedure that enables members of different institutions to access protected information that is distributed on different web servers.

Traditional approaches to authorization and access control in computer systems are not sufficient to address the requirements of federated and distributed systems, where infrastructural support may be required. Authentication and authorization infrastructure solutions address such limitations. With an AAI, access control is not managed by a central register, but by the respective organization of the user who wishes to access a specific resource.

In Switzerland, the SWITCH Information Technology Services Foundation is developing a Shibboleth-based AAI system that helps Swiss universities in particular to make their e-learning offers accessible to students beyond their own institutional boundaries. Based on the success of SWITCHaai, other countries are following with their own AAI projects.

Projects 
 CSTCloud AAI, China
 DFN-AAI, Germany
 ELIXIR AAI, UK
 EOSC-hub AAI, European Union
 GARR IDEM AAI, Italy
 GRNET AAI, Greece
 SWITCHaai, Switzerland

See also 
 Authentication
 Authorization
 Central Authentication Service
 Federated identity
 Identity as a service (IDaaS)
 Identity management
 Infrastructure as a service (IaaS)
 Keycloak
 List of single sign-on implementations
 OpenAthens
 Shibboleth Single Sign-on architecture

References 

Authentication
Access control
Federated identity